Robert or Bob Jarvis may refer to:
 Robert Jarvis (rugby league), English rugby league player
 Bob Jarvis (politician), member of the House of Commons of Canada
 Cob Jarvis (Robert Winston Jarvis), basketball player and coach
 Bob Jarvis (rugby league), New Zealand rugby league player
 Bob Jarvis (sport shooter), British sports shooter
 Rob Jarvis, English television and film actor
 Robbie Jarvis, British actor
 Pat Jarvis (baseball) (Robert Patrick Jarvis), American baseball player